Bobby Hutchinson (born 19 June 1953 in Glasgow) is a Scottish former professional footballer.

An inspirational captain, a career highlight came on 24 May 1986, when he lifted the Associate Members' Cup at Wembley Stadium as Bristol City beat Bolton Wanderers 3-0 in the final.

References

External links
 

1953 births
Living people
Footballers from Glasgow
Association football midfielders
Scottish footballers
Montrose F.C. players
Dundee F.C. players
Hibernian F.C. players
Wigan Athletic F.C. players
Tranmere Rovers F.C. players
Mansfield Town F.C. players
Bristol City F.C. players
Walsall F.C. players
Blackpool F.C. players
Carlisle United F.C. players
Scottish Football League players
English Football League players